Bhadane is a village in the Thane district of Maharashtra, India. It is located in the Bhiwandi Taluka.

Demographics 

According to the 2011 census of India, Bhadane has 615 households. The effective literacy rate (i.e. the literacy rate of population excluding children aged 6 and below) is 78.05%.

Bhadane Industrial Area 

Maharashtra Industrial Development Corporation i.e MIDC has declared in March 2020 development of "Bhadane Industrial Area" over 265 acres of land for setting up Warehousing and Logistics Park

 This Warehousing and Logistics Park is being developed to cater to warehouse needs of E-commerce companies, B2C companies to store, supply and distribute goods to major consumer markets of Mumbai, Thane and Kalyan.
 By road, it is at a distance of 2 km from the touchdown of Samruddhi Mahamarg Highway, interchange of Delhi - Mumbai E-highway & the JNPT port spur of Samruddhi Mahamarg
 Bhadane Industrial Area's infrastructure is being developed by MIDC providing Power, Water and Road access with master planning as per MIDC's DCR and FSI of One.
 It will create direct job opportunities for 2500 persons and indirect employment for 5000 persons.

References 

Villages in Bhiwandi taluka